Verghese Kurien (26 November 1921 – 9 September 2012), known as the "Father of the White Revolution" in India, was a social entrepreneur whose "billion-litre idea", Operation Flood, made dairy farming India's largest self-sustaining industry and the largest rural employment sector providing a third of all rural income. It made India the world's largest milk producer, doubled the milk available for each person, and increased milk output four-fold in 30 years.

He pioneered the Anand model of dairy cooperatives and replicated it nationwide, based on various "top-down" and "bottom-up" approaches, where no milk from a farmer was refused and 70–80% of the price by consumers was paid in cash to dairy farmers who controlled the marketing, procurement, and processing of milk and milk products as the dairy's owners.  An invention at Amul was the production of milk powder from buffalo milk instead of from cow milk, which was in short supply in India.

He also made India self-sufficient in edible oils and fought against the "oil kings", who used underhanded and violent methods to enforce their dominance over the oilseed industry.

Early life and education
Kurien was born on 26 November 1921 in Kozhikode, Kerala, as the son of civil surgeon Dr. P. K. Kurien, to an Anglican Suriyani Nasrani family. He attended school at Diamond Jubilee Higher Secondary School, Gobichettipalayam, in Coimbatore district (now Erode district, Tamil Nadu) while his father worked at the government hospital there. He joined Loyola College (an affiliated college of the University of Madras) at the age of 14, graduated in physics in 1940, and received a bachelor's degree in mechanical engineering from the College of Engineering, Guindy, which at that time was also part of the University of Madras, in 1943. His father died when he was 22 years old. Shortly afterwards, his maternal grand-uncle Cherian Matthai, took Kurien's family under his wings and brought them to his home in Trichur. He wanted to join the army as an engineer, but his mother persuaded him to join the Tata Steel Technical Institute, Jamshedpur, on a recommendation by his uncle, who was a director with the Tatas, and from where he graduated in 1946. He soon wanted to disassociate with his uncle's sycophants.

Kurien left and applied for a scholarship provided by the government of India, and chose to study dairy engineering. His uncle John Matthai, the finance minister, refused to bail him out. He was sent to the Imperial Institute of Animal Husbandry in Bangalore (now, National Dairy Research Institute, southern station, Bengaluru) where he spent nine months before being sent to America to study at Michigan State University, on a government scholarship. He returned with a master's degree in mechanical engineering (metallurgy) with a minor in nuclear physics in 1948.

Later, he would say, "I was sent to study dairy engineering (on the only government scholarship left). I cheated a bit though," and "studied metallurgical and nuclear engineering, disciplines likely to be of far greater use to my soon-to-be independent country and, quite frankly, to me." dairying then, and to Australia, when he learned to set up the Amul dairy.

Turning point
In 1949, Kurien was sent by the government of India to its run-down, experimental creamery at Anand, Bombay province (later Bombay state and now part of Gujarat state since 1960) to serve five years as an officer in the dairy division. He spent time going to Bombay city on weekends and under the pretext of work, volunteered to tinker with the primitive dairy equipment of Tribhuvandas Patel, who sought his help to process the milk of farmers he had brought together after a strike in 1946, and formed a cooperative to purchase their milk at nearby Kaira (now Kheda).

Kurien decided to quit the government job mid-way and leave Anand but was persuaded by Patel to stay with him after quitting them, and help him set up his dairy cooperative. Kurien established the dairy cooperative, Kaira District Cooperative Milk Producers' Union Limited (KDCMPUL) (popularly known as Amul - Anand Milk Utpadak Ltd Dairy), at Anand, in the year 1950.

Work

Foundation of the dairy and its structure
The farmers faced a problem of fluctuating milk production as surplus milk found no buyers in the flush season (when animals produce more milk) and turned to the cooperative for help, where a proposal to convert the surplus into milk powder was made. Kurien's batchmate from America and dairy engineer H. M. Dalaya, who he persuaded to stay back at Anand after a visit, invented the process of making skim milk powder and condensed milk from buffalo milk instead of from cow milk. In India, buffalo milk was plentiful, while cow milk was in short supply, unlike Europe. For this reason, Amul competed successfully against Nestle, the leading competitor for milk, and later against Glaxo for baby food. Later research by Dr. G. H. Wilster led to cheese production from buffalo milk at Amul. To cut costs, Kurien procured a captive packaging-tin unit attached to the dairy facility.

Amul organised dairy farmers in the villages and linked them directly to consumers in the market by eliminating middlemen, ensuring a steady and a regular income for them even during the lean season, and better quality products at a competitive price to consumers in the large market of the reachable Bombay city, over well-paved village "milk roads" and "cold-chains".

Political and social conditions
Kurien and his mentor Patel were backed by some political leaders and bureaucrats who saw merit in their pioneering cooperative model: farmers willing to associate together for  produce and willing to be led by professionals while being owners of the cooperative. India had just gained political freedom from a colonial power whom the leaders had seen extorting land tax unjustly from farmers suffering from crop failure. There had been many famines over the duration of that regime, so leaders were concerned over food security of the population. As a newly independent nation, there was a desire to gain self-sufficiency in its consumed produce and a thrust towards domestic production to substitute for imports. Moreover, these nationalist leaders were influenced by socialist ideals of formation of social capital more than the formation of capital assets, and the Gandhian philosophy of production by the masses triumphed mass-production in a resource-constrained nation. At the same time, the new government's policies were open to the skills and learnings of modern experts, research, technological prowess, and aid from the rest of the world.

The first farmers in the cooperative all belonged to Patel's predominant caste-grouping, which helped to bring all of them together quickly before farmers from other castes became interested and participated. Rather than focusing directly on removing caste and class conflicts which get entrenched as vested interests, Patel worked singularly on the belief that economic self-interest of all sections of the village-society would make them align together to grow their cooperative.

Consolidation
Amul's cooperative dairying venture became popular. Dignitaries, researchers, trainees, and common folk would visit Anand to learn more about it. Earlier, former Prime Minister Jawaharlal Nehru had visited Anand to inaugurate Amul's plant, the largest in Asia, and praised Kurien for his groundbreaking work.

In 1956, Kurien visited Nestle in Switzerland at the invitation of the commerce and industries minister, to ask them to reduce imports of Indian production and have more Indians inducted, but they told him that making condensed milk "could not be left to the natives". He returned to India and boosted Amul's production and market of condensed milk; after two years the government banned the import of condensed milk into the country. Amul also faced serious competition from imported butter, especially from New Zealand. Nehru, who trusted Kurien, cut imports of butter in tandem, with Kurien promising and delivering an incremental increase of his production to eliminate butter shortage. During the 1962 Indo-China war, the government relied on Kurien to provide supplies to the army. He had to divert these away from his civilian market. When Polson started grabbing his market share, Kurien ensured the government froze Polson's production lines, as part of the war effort.

Spreading around and nationwide
In 1965, Prime Minister Lal Bahadur Shastri tasked Kurien to replicate the dairy's Anand scheme nationwide for which, the National Dairy Development Board (NDDB) was founded under Kurien on his conditions, that it be independent of governmental control and that it be set up at Anand, away from the capitals and closer to farmers. Kurien was mindful of meddling by the political class and bureaucrats sitting in the capital cities, letting it be known upfront.

He was negotiated with donors like the UNICEF for aid and confronted the New Zealand government and a lobbies in countries which he realised wanted to "convert aid into trade" for their companies, contrary to his ideal of India becoming self-sufficient. He used the proceeds from the sale of that "mountains and lakes" of dumped aid in the Indian markets as his "billion-litre idea" to encourage the movement of high-yield native cattle to urban areas and set up milksheds and dairy farms nationwide to stabilise the dairy markets of big cities.

The Anand dairy was replicated in Gujarat's districts around it and he set brought all of them under Gujarat Co-operative Milk Marketing Federation Ltd. (GCMMF) in 1973 to sell their products under a single Amul brand. Many states emulated setting up their federations based on this scheme with varying degrees of success, notably, with Karnataka's brand Nandini, Rajasthan's brand Saras and Bihar's brand Sudha.

Shastri also took Kurien's help to manage the Delhi Milk Scheme; Kurien swiftly corrected prices.

In 1979, he founded the Institute of Rural Management Anand (IRMA) to groom managers for the cooperatives.

Intervention in other marks and international aid
Kurien was inspired by prime ministers Indira Gandhi and Rajiv Gandhi's methods on setting up cooperatives and plants, Indira's intervention in fruits and vegetables, and Rajiv's intervention in oilseeds and edible oil markets. Brands resulting from these – Dhara (Operation Golden Flow for cooking oils), Mother Dairy (Operation Flood) and Safal (for vegetables) have become common household names.

Kurien was crucial in setting up similar cooperatives across India and beyond. In 1979, Premier Alexei Kosygin invited Kurien to the Soviet Union for advice on its cooperatives. In 1982, Pakistan invited him to set up dairy cooperatives, where he led a World Bank mission. Around 1989, China implemented its own Operation Flood-like programme with the help of Kurien and the World Food Programme. Former Prime Minister Narasimha Rao sought his help to set up a dairy cooperative in neighbouring Sri Lanka which was done as a collaboration with NDDB later in 1997.

Market domination and aftermath
In the 1990s he lobbied and fought hard to keep multinational companies from entering the dairy business even as the country opened up all its other markets to them after decades of protection. India became the world's largest milk producer by 1998, surpassing the United States of America, with about 17 percent of global output in 2010–2011.

In 1998, he persuaded former Prime Minister Atal Bihari Vajpayee to appoint Dr. Amrita Patel as his successor at NDDB, whom he had groomed under him to keep government bureaucrats away from the post and protect NDDB's independence from the government. Later, he had differences with her on the direction she was taking cooperative dairying—by solely focusing on production and yield targets through corporatisation and competition at the expense of weakening the cooperative institutions of the country. For instance, marketing no longer remaining with the farmers' cooperatives and being handed over to private or corporate interests, as that would mean foregoing the ability to determine the price to be paid by consumers, the quality of the produce to be offered to them, and losing the "lion's share" of the money paid by the consumer to these corporates.

He resigned from the position of GCMMF Chairman in 2006 after dwindling support from new members on the governing board and mounting dissent from his protegés (some referring to his work ethic as dictatorial) backed by political forces desperate to make inroads into the cooperative dairy's district unions.

He was handed over the chairmanship of Tribhuvandas Foundation – an NGO to work on women and child health in Kheda district, by Tribhuvandas Patel, as the trust started to grow rapidly after receiving foreign grants.

Control over the Amul group GCMMF has been constantly disputed in court.

In popular culture 
Filmmaker Shyam Benegal wanted to make Manthan ("churning of the milk ocean", in Hindu mythology) a story based on Amul, but lacked funds. Kurien got his half a million member-farmers to contribute two rupees to make the movie, which was released in 1976. Many farmers came to see "their film" and made it a success at the box office, which emboldened distributors to release it to nationwide audiences. In 2005, he wrote the book I Too Had A Dream, a narrative about the empowerment of farmers and development of milk cooperatives in India, audio version of which was produced by Atul Bhide.

Manthan's success inspired Kurien with another idea. A veterinarian, a milk technician, and a fodder specialist would tour other parts of the country in real life along with the film to persuade farmers to form cooperatives of their own. The UNDP used the movie to start similar cooperatives in Latin America and screened it in Africa.

Kurien's support was crucial in making the "Amul girl" ad campaign as one of the longest running, and Surabhi, a TV series on Indian culture fetching millions of postcards from viewers, one of the longest running on national television during the 1990s.

In 2013, Amar Chitra Katha published the comic book Verghese Kurien: The Man with the Billion Litre idea. Book was given the synopsis 'The story of Dr. Kurien is the story of Amul.

Death
Kurien died from an illness at the age of 90 on 9 September 2012 at a Nadiad hospital, near Anand. His wife, Molly, hosted the visitors in Anand. Kurien was brought up as a Christian before becoming an atheist. He was cremated and is survived by a daughter, Nirmala, and grandson.

Awards and honours
In 2014, all the major dairy groups in the country, along with the Indian Dairy Association, resolved to observe Kurien's birthday, 26 November, as National Milk Day. He had been bestowed with honorary degrees by the Michigan State University and the Swedish University of Agricultural Sciences.

Kurien either headed or was on the boards of several public institutions and received honorary doctorate degrees from universities worldwide. Lectures by eminent speakers are held in his memory to apply "lessons from the dairy sector" through his work to ongoing rural issues such as "an Amul model for pulses", to pass down management strategies for rural India's social organisation, or to use his work to fundraise and promote "growth with justice". Kurien was also awarded the Red & White Lifetime Achievements National Award (now known as Godfrey Phillips Bravery Awards).

Notes

References

Further reading

Literary work 
 Kurien, Verghese (2005) I Too Had a Dream. APH Publishing Corp. 
 Kurien, Verghese (1997) An Unfinished Dream. Tata-McGraw-Hill. 
 Kurien, Verghese (2012) The Man Who Made The Elephant Dance

External links

 Official Website of Verghese Kurien
 Official Biography – Amul
 The Amul Saga by Verghese Kurien
 Amul's 25th Anniversary Celebrations

1921 births
2012 deaths
20th-century Indian businesspeople
20th-century Indian engineers
21st-century Indian businesspeople
Businesspeople from Kozhikode
Indian cooperative organizers
Deaths from kidney failure
Engineers from Kerala
Indian atheists
Indian chief executives
Indian mechanical engineers
Indian social entrepreneurs
Loyola College, Chennai alumni
Malayali people
Michigan State University alumni
People from Kerala
Ramon Magsaysay Award winners
Recipients of the Order of Agricultural Merit
Recipients of the Padma Bhushan in trade and industry
Recipients of the Padma Shri in trade and industry
Recipients of the Padma Vibhushan in science & engineering
University of Madras alumni
Agriculture and food award winners